Brusa saxicola is a butterfly in the family Hesperiidae. It is found in the Democratic Republic of the Congo (the south-west and Shaba), northern Zambia and western Tanzania.

References

Butterflies described in 1910
Hesperiinae